"Baby" is a song by American recording artist Angie Stone. It was written by Stone along with Corey "Co-T" Tatum and Kevin "5 Star" Norton for her fourth studio album, The Art of Love & War (2007), while production was helmed by Tatum and Noton 5 Star. The song is built around a sample of "Give Me Your Love (Love Song)" by Curtis Mayfield. Due to the inclusion of the sample, Mayfield is also credited as a songwriter. It served as the album's first single as well as Stone's debut released with Stax Records. "Baby" became her second song to reach the top of Billboards Adult R&B Songs in the United States.

Music Video
The music video for the song featured a guest appearance by comedian Mike Epps.

Track listings

Personnel

 Alex Al – bass guitar
 Michael Butler – guitar
 Khaliq "Khaliq-O-Vision" Glover – mixing
 Jon Nettlesbey – mixing
 Rex Rideout – piano

 Angie Stone – vocals
 Diamond Stone – backing vocals
 Tianna Vallen – backing vocals
 Betty Wright – vocals

Charts

Weekly charts

Year-end charts

References

External links
 

2007 songs
2007 singles
Songs written by Angie Stone
Stax Records singles
Songs written by Curtis Mayfield
Angie Stone songs
Betty Wright songs